Tigist Gashaw Belay (born 25 December 1996) is an Ethiopian-born middle-distance runner competing internationally for Bahrain. She represented that country at the 2016 Summer Olympics without advancing from the first round. Earlier she won the gold at the 2013 World Youth Championships starting for her native Ethiopia.

International competitions

Personal bests
Outdoor
800 metres – 2:05.11 (Amiens 2014)
1500 metres – 4:05.58 (Székesfehérvár 2015)
3000 metres – 8:48.60 (Doha 2016)
Indoor
1500 metres – 4:16.45 (Eaubonne 2016)
3000 metres – 8:55.89 (Mondeville 2016)

References

1996 births
Living people
Bahraini female middle-distance runners
Ethiopian female middle-distance runners
Athletes (track and field) at the 2016 Summer Olympics
Athletes (track and field) at the 2018 Asian Games
Olympic athletes of Bahrain
Ethiopian emigrants to Bahrain
Naturalized citizens of Bahrain
Asian Games medalists in athletics (track and field)
Asian Games silver medalists for Bahrain
Medalists at the 2018 Asian Games